Placitas, also known as La Placita and Las Placitas del Rio Bonito, in Lincoln County, New Mexico is a now abandoned village along the frontier between the New Mexico Territory and Confederate Arizona that was the site of the Battle of Placito, between Apache and native New Mexicans aided by Confederate soldiers from Fort Stanton, ten miles away to the north. The village was originally called La Placita del Rio Bonito (The Place by the Pretty River), Placitas is now known as Lincoln. The village has historical ties to Billy the Kid.

The area was originally inhabited by local Indigeous peoples, the Mogollon, later the Piros people, followed by the Mescalero Apache. In the 1850s, the village was established by Native New Mexican settlers from the North who spoke Spanish. The Torréon tower was one of the first structures built in the village as a defensive fortification.

References

Ghost towns in New Mexico
Villages in Lincoln County, New Mexico